The 2016–17 All-Ireland Senior Club Football Championship was the 47th annual Gaelic football club championship since its establishment in the 1970-71 season. The winners receive The Andy Merrigan Cup.

On St. Patrick's Day 17 March 2017, Dr. Crokes from Kerry won the title for the second time by defeating Slaughtneil of Derry 1-9 to 1-7 in the final at Croke Park. Johnny Buckley was the winning captain.

The 2015-16 champions were Ballyboden St. Endas from Dublin who defeated Castlebar Mitchels of Mayo on 17 March 2016 to win their 1st title.  They were defeated in the second round of the 2016 Dublin Championship by Kilmacud Crokes.

Results

Connacht Senior Club Football Championship

Quarter-finals

Semi-finals

Final

Leinster Senior Club Football Championship

First round

Quarter-finals

Semi-finals

Final

Munster Senior Club Football Championship

Quarter-finals

Semi-finals

Final

Ulster Senior Club Football Championship

Preliminary round

Quarter-finals

Semi-finals

Final

All-Ireland Senior Football Championship

Quarter-final

Semi-finals

Final

Championship statistics

Top scorers

Overall

In a single game

References

All-Ireland Senior Club Football Championship
All-Ireland Senior Club Football Championship
All-Ireland Senior Club Football Championship